In mathematics, a 2-valued morphism is a homomorphism that sends a Boolean algebra B onto the two-element Boolean algebra 2 = {0,1}. It is essentially the same thing as an ultrafilter on B, and, in a different way, also the same things as a maximal ideal of B. 2-valued morphisms have also been proposed as a tool for unifying the language of physics.

2-valued morphisms, ultrafilters and maximal ideals 
Suppose B is a Boolean algebra.

 If s : B → 2 is a 2-valued morphism, then the set of elements of B that are sent to 1 is an ultrafilter on B, and the set of elements of B that are sent to 0 is a maximal ideal of B.
 If U is an ultrafilter on B, then the complement of U is a maximal ideal of B, and there is exactly one 2-valued morphism s : B → 2 that sends the ultrafilter to 1 and the maximal ideal to 0.
 If M is a maximal ideal of B, then the complement of M is an ultrafilter on B, and there is exactly one 2-valued morphism s : B → 2 that sends the ultrafilter to 1 and the maximal ideal to 0.

Physics 
If the elements of B are viewed as "propositions about some object", then a 2-valued morphism on B can be interpreted as representing a particular "state of that object", namely the one where the propositions of B which are mapped to 1 are true, and the propositions mapped to 0 are false. Since the morphism conserves the Boolean operators (negation, conjunction, etc.), the set of true propositions will not be inconsistent but will correspond to a particular maximal conjunction of propositions, denoting the (atomic) state.   (The true propositions form an ultrafilter, the false propositions form a maximal ideal, as mentioned above.)

The transition between two states s1 and s2 of B, represented by 2-valued morphisms, can then be represented by an automorphism f from B to B, such that s2 o f = s1.

The possible states of different objects defined in this way can be conceived as representing potential events. The set of events can then be structured in the same way as invariance of causal structure, or local-to-global causal connections or even formal properties of global causal connections.

The morphisms between (non-trivial) objects could be viewed as representing causal connections leading from one event to another one. For example, the morphism f above leads form event s1 to event s2. The sequences or "paths" of morphisms for which there is no inverse morphism, could then be interpreted as defining horismotic or chronological precedence relations. These relations would then determine a temporal order, a topology, and possibly a metric.

According to, "A minimal realization of such a relationally determined space-time structure can be found". In this model there are, however, no explicit distinctions. This is equivalent to a model where each object is characterized by only one distinction: (presence, absence) or (existence, non-existence) of an event.   In this manner, "the 'arrows' or the 'structural language' can then be interpreted as morphisms which conserve this unique distinction".

If more than one distinction is considered, however, the model becomes much more complex, and the interpretation of distinction states as events, or morphisms as processes, is much less straightforward.

References

External links
"Representation and Change - A metarepresentational framework for the foundations of physical and cognitive science"

Boolean algebra